John or Jack Eccles may refer to:

John Eccles (neurophysiologist) (1903–1997), Australian neurophysiologist and Nobel laureate 
John Eccles (composer) (1668–1735), English composer
John Eccles, 2nd Viscount Eccles (born 1931), British businessman
John Eccles (Royal Navy officer) (1898–1966), Commander-in-Chief, Home Fleet 1955–1958
John Scott Eccles, a fictional character and the client of Sherlock Holmes in "The Adventure of Wisteria Lodge"
Jack Eccles (footballer) (1869–1932), English footballer with Stoke
Jack Eccles (trade unionist) (1922–2010), British trade unionist
John Eccles (mayor), Lord mayor of Dublin in 1710

See also
John Echols (1823–1896), Confederate Army general
Johnny Echols (born 1947), musician